The 1384 Yellow River flood was a natural disaster affecting the area around Kaifeng, China, during the early Ming dynasty.

References

History of Kaifeng
Disasters in Ming dynasty
Kaifeng Flood, 1384
Yellow River Flood, 1384
Yellow River floods
14th-century floods